Edward Salmon may refer to:
Edward Salmon (soldier), 17th century soldier and MP for Scarborough
Edward Togo Salmon (1905–1988), British ancient historian
Edward Salmon (cricketer) (1853–1907), English cricketer
Edward H. Salmon (born 1942), American politician in the New Jersey General Assembly
Edward L. Salmon Jr. (1934-2016) American bishop, Episcopal Church
Edward D. Salmon, professor, department of biology, University of North Carolina, Chapel Hill, Member US-NAS